Deh Nowiyeh or Deh Nevoiyeh may refer to:
 Deh Nevoiyeh, Kerman
 Deh Nowiyeh, Kuhbanan, Kerman Province
 Deh Nowiyeh, Yazd